Heroes of the Environment is a list published in Time magazine. The third list was published in September 2009. It contains 30 entries, individuals or groups, that have contributed substantially to the preservation of environment. It is divided into four categories: Leaders and Visionaries, Activists, Scientists and Innovators, and Moguls and Entrepreneurs.

Leaders and Visionaries

Mohamed Nasheed
Cameron Diaz
Mike H. Pandey
Prince Mostapha Zaher
Marcio Santilli
Yann Arthus-Bertrand
Erik Solheim
Steven Chu, Carol Browner, Ken Salazar and Lisa P. Jackson

Activists

Joe Romm
Marc Ona
Father Marco Arana
Syeda Rizwana Hasan
Yuyun Ismawati
Zhao Zhong
Nnimmo Bassey

Scientists and Innovators

Takashi Yabe
Residents of Vauban
Valerie Casey
David Keith (scientist)
Bindeshwar Pathak
Olga Speranskaya
Pen Hadow, Martin Hartley, and Ann Daniels
Nathan Lorenz and Tim Bauer

Moguls and Entrepreneurs

Sheri Liao
Thomas Harttung
Dorjee Sun
Asim Buksh
Kin Lui, Raymond Ho and Casson Trenor
Yumi Someya
Bill Weihl, Google.org's green energy czar

See also
Environmental Media Awards
Global 500 Roll of Honour
Global Environmental Citizen Award
Goldman Environmental Prize
Grantham Prize
Tyler Prize for Environmental Achievement
Nuclear-Free Future Award

References

Environmental awards
Time (magazine)
Awards by magazines
Culture and the environment
2009 awards
2009 in the environment